Charles Thomas Gaskell (October 23, 1920 - September 14, 2000) was the ninth Bishop of the Episcopal Diocese of Milwaukee.

Early life and education
Gaskell was born on October 23, 1920, in Saint Paul, Minnesota, the son of Chester Welles Gaskell and Gertrude Pauline Michaud. He was educated at the St Paul High School. He then studied at the University of Minnesota and graduated with a Bachelor of Arts in 1940. Following that, he commenced studies at Seabury-Western Theological Seminary, and earned a Bachelor of Divinity in 1944. That same year, on June 1, he married Mabel Harriet Armitage, and together had three children. He was awarded an honorary Doctor of Divinity from Seabury in 1967.

Ordained Ministry
Gaskell was ordained deacon in June 1944, and priest on December 21, 1944, by Bishop Stephen Keeler of Minnesota in St Mark's Cathedral, Minneapolis. He initially served as priest-in-charge of Holy Trinity Church in International Falls, Minnesota, and St Peter's Church in Warroad, Minnesota. In 1948, he became curate of St Matthew's Church in Evanston, Illinois, while in 1949, he took upon himself the rectorship of Trinity Church in Rock Island, Illinois. In 1958, he became rector of St Mark's Church in Milwaukee, and in 1966 rector of St Luke's Church in Evanston, Illinois. In 1971, he was appointed Dean of St Luke's Cathedral in Orlando, Florida, a post he retained till 1973.

Episcopacy
In 1973, Gaskell was elected Coadjutor Bishop of Milwaukee, and was consecrated on June 30, 1973, by Presiding Bishop John E. Hines. He became diocesan bishop in 1974 following the retirement of Bishop Donald Hathaway Valentine Hallock. He was a member of the Confraternity of the Blessed Sacrament and a priest associate of the Sisterhood of the Holy Nativity. He was a founder of the Evangelical and Catholic Mission. He retired in 1985, becoming a member of the board of directors of the Living Church Foundation, a post he held till 1996.

References

1920 births
2000 deaths
20th-century Anglican bishops in the United States
University of Minnesota alumni
Clergy from Saint Paul, Minnesota
Episcopal bishops of Milwaukee